The Barefoot Mailman is a comedy-adventure film starring Robert Cummings and distributed by Columbia Pictures in 1951. The film was based on the 1943 novel The Barefoot Mailman by Theodore Pratt.  Filmed in Super Cinecolor on location in Florida where the events take place, it features many elements of the Western.

Plot
Set in 1895, Robert Cummings plays a con man, Sylvanus Hurley, who is trying to raise the selling price of land he owns by convincing the residents of Miami that a railroad is coming to town. Jerome Courtland plays the barefoot mailman, Steven Pierton, who leads Sylvanus along the beach from Palm Beach to Miami, and who is skeptical of Sylvanus's scheme. Terry Moore is a run-away teenager, Adie Titus, who joins Sylvanus and Steven on their walk by impersonating a child. John Russell plays Theron, a swamp gang leader who tries to carry Adie away.

Cast
Robert Cummings as Sylvanus Hurley
Terry Moore as Adie Titus
Jerome Courtland as Steven Pierton
John Russell as Theron
Will Geer as Dan Paget
Arthur Shields as Ben Titus
Trevor Bardette as Oat McCarty
Arthur Space as Piggott
Frank Ferguson as Doc Bethune
Percy Helton as Dewey Durgan
Ellen Corby as Miss Della
Renie Riano as Miss Emily

Production
The film was based on a novel by Theodore Pratt published in 1943. The New York Times called it "salty and colorful."

In April 1950 Columbia reported that Alfred Lewis Levitt was writing a screenplay based on the book for the studio. In September, Columbia said they would film the bulk of the movie in Florida starting October 3.

Cummings was cast in November 1950.

References

External links

The Barefoot Mailman at TCMDB

1951 films
1950s adventure comedy films
American adventure comedy films
Cinecolor films
Columbia Pictures films
1950s English-language films
Films scored by George Duning
Films based on American novels
Films set in 1895
Films set in Florida
Films shot in Florida
American historical comedy films
1950s historical comedy films
1951 comedy films
Films directed by Earl McEvoy
1950s American films